Joseph K. Leibham (born June 6, 1969) is an American business executive and lobbyist who served as a Republican member of the Wisconsin Senate, representing the 9th District from 2002 to 2014. He previously served in the Wisconsin Assembly, representing the 26th district from 1998 to 2002.

In December 2014, he resigned from the Senate, to become chief lobbyist for the Milwaukee-based law firm of Foley & Lardner.

Leibham is married to Heather (née Hanson); they have two sons and a daughter.

Early life, education and career
Leibham was born and raised in Sheboygan, the fourth oldest of 13 children. He attended Pigeon River Public Elementary School, Trinity Lutheran School and Sheboygan Area Lutheran High School. He attended the University of Wisconsin–La Crosse and Ealing College (London) before graduating from the University of Wisconsin–Madison in 1991 with a B.A. in Political Science and Public Administration.

He worked in the food service industry as an account executive for Sargento Foods and the manager of membership development for the Sheboygan County Chamber of Commerce.

Political career

Sheboygan City Council
From 1993 to 2000, Leibham served on the Sheboygan City Council serving as its president from 1995 to 1996.

Wisconsin State Assembly
Leibham served in the Wisconsin State Assembly from 1998 to 2002, representing Sheboygan, Sheboygan Falls, Kohler and surrounding areas.

Wisconsin State Senate
In 2002, Leibham announced his candidacy for the 9th Senate District. He narrowly defeated, by 46 votes, James Baumgart.
 
His 9th Senate District comprises the northern half of Sheboygan and southern half of Manitowoc counties, as well as portions of Calumet and Fond du Lac counties. He served as the Senate President Pro Tempore. He was the assistant minority leader in 2007 and the majority caucus vice chairperson in 2003. 

Leibham has called for the repeal of the Affordable Care Act, calling it a "top priority."

In December 2014, he resigned from the Senate, saying he was prohibited by state law from discussing job offers in the private sector while he was a sitting legislator. Two days later, it was announced that Leibham would accept a position as chief lobbyist for the Milwaukee-based law firm of Foley & Lardner.

Congressional bid 
In 2014, rather than seek re-election, Leibham ran in the Republican primary election for the United States House of Representatives; he lost to Glenn Grothman.

References

External links
 Joseph K. Leibham at Foley & Lardner
 Joseph Leibham at Ballotpedia
 Senator Joseph K. Leibham at Wisconsin Legislature
 

|-

Republican Party Wisconsin state senators
Republican Party members of the Wisconsin State Assembly
American Lutherans
1969 births
Living people
Politicians from Sheboygan, Wisconsin
Businesspeople from Wisconsin
American lobbyists
University of Wisconsin–Madison College of Letters and Science alumni
Alumni of the University of West London
21st-century American politicians
University of Wisconsin–La Crosse alumni